Schwegel may refer to:

 Three-hole pipe, a musical instrument usually played alongside tabor (drum)
 Theresa Schwegel (born 1975), American writer